Maceda may refer to:

Maceda (surname)
Maceda, Ourense, a municipality in Ourense, Galicia, Spain
Maceda, Portugal, a parish in Ovar
Maceda (moth), a genus of moths